was an old province of Japan in the area that is today part of Fukuoka Prefecture in Kyūshū. Chikuzen bordered Buzen, Bungo, Chikugo, and Hizen Provinces.

History
The original provincial capital is believed to be near Dazaifu, although Fukuoka city has become dominant in modern times.

At the end of the 13th century, Chikuzen was the landing point for a Mongol invasion force. But the main force was destroyed by a typhoon (later called kamikaze).

In April 1336, Kikuchi Taketoshi attacked the Shoni clan stronghold at Dazaifu.  At the time, the Shoni were allied with Ashikaga Takauji in his battles against Go-Daigo.  The Shoni were defeated, which led to the suicide of several clan members, including their leader Shoni Sadatsune. 

In the Meiji period, the provinces of Japan were converted into prefectures.  Maps of Japan and Chikuzen Province were reformed in the 1870s.  At the same time, the province continued to exist for some purposes.  For example, Chikuzen is explicitly recognized in treaties in 1894 (a) between Japan and the United States and (b) between Japan and the United Kingdom.

The name persists in features such as the Chikuhō Main Line (JR Kyushu) and stations Chikuzen Habu and Chikuzen Ueki. The adjacent Haruda Line includes Chikuzen Uchino and Chikuzen Yamae stations, reflecting the region in the time the rail networks were established.

Shrines and temples

Sumiyoshi-jinja and Hakosaki-gū (Hakozaki Shrine?) were the chief Shinto shrines (ichinomiya) of Chikuzen.

Historical districts
 Fukuoka Prefecture
 Geza District (下座郡) - merged with Johza and Yasu Districts to become Asakura District (朝倉郡) on February 26, 1896
 Honami District (穂波郡) - merged with Kama District to become Kaho District (嘉穂郡) on February 26, 1896
 Ito District (怡土郡) - merged with Shima District to become Itoshima District (糸島郡) on February 26, 1896
 Johza District (上座郡) - merged with Geza and Yasu Districts to become Asakura District on February 26, 1896
 Kama District (嘉麻郡) - merged with Honami District to become Kaho District on February 26, 1896
 Kasuya District (糟屋郡)
 Kurate District (鞍手郡)
 Mikasa District (御笠郡) - merged with Mushiroda and Naka Districts to become Chikushi District (筑紫郡) on February 26, 1896
 Munakata District (宗像郡) - dissolved
 Mushiroda District (席田郡) - merged with Mikasa and Naka Districts to become Chikushi District on February 26, 1896
 Naka District (那珂郡) - merged with Mikasa and Mushiroda Districts to become Chikushi District on February 26, 1896
 Onga District (遠賀郡)
 Sawara District (早良郡) - dissolved
 Shima District (志摩郡) - merged with Ito District to become Itoshima District on February 26, 1896
 Yasu District (夜須郡) - merged with Geza and Johza Districts to become Asakura District on February 26, 1896

See also
 Fukuoka Domain

Notes

References
 Nussbaum, Louis-Frédéric and Käthe Roth. (2005).  Japan encyclopedia. Cambridge: Harvard University Press. ;  OCLC 58053128
 Papinot, Edmond. (1910). Historical and Geographic Dictionary of Japan. Tokyo: Librarie Sansaisha. OCLC 77691250

External links 

  Murdoch's map of provinces, 1903

Former provinces of Japan